Return to Two Moon Junction is a 1994 romantic drama film which serves as a sequel to the 1988 film Two Moon Junction. The plot concerns a New York fashion model who returns to her Georgia home town where she has an affair with a local sculptor. The film was directed by Farhad Mann, and stars Melinda Clarke, Wendy Davis, and Louise Fletcher.

The movie had a wide cinema release in Russia in summer of 1994.

Plot
Savannah Delongpre (Melinda Clarke) is a wealthy runway fashion model living in New York City who returns to her small town in Georgia in order to get away from her stressful and demanding spotlight life and to visit her wealthy grandmother, Belle (Louise Fletcher; the only actress to appear in this and the previous Two Moon Junction film). While staying with Belle, Savannah views some homemade 8mm films about her childhood past which include her recently deceased mother. There is also a subtle reference to the first Two Moon Junction film in which Belle tells Savannah about her cousin April having abandoned her recently married husband to run off with a stranger.

While visiting her childhood home, which includes a swamp property called Two Moon Junction owned by the Delongpre family, Savannah has a run-in with Jake Gilbert (John Clayton Schafer), a rugged but good-natured drifter living in a small house on the property. Jake is an artist who comes from a poor family that has had a decades-long feud with the Delongpre family. Unwilling to return to New York right away, Savannah eventually begins a sordid affair with Jake despite their backgrounds. Savannah tries to persuade Jake to come to New York City with her so he can open his own art gallery to display and sell his scrap-metal sculptures. However, the prideful Jake repeatedly refuses because he makes sculptures out of principle rather than for money.

Belle soon learns about Savannah's tryst with Jake and tries, any way she can, to break them up. After failing to bribe Jake to end his tryst with Savannah, Belle tracks down and contacts Savannah's possessive fiancee Robert Lee (Yorgo Constantine). Robert arrives in town and colludes with Belle to break up the relationship by purchasing the Two Moon Junction property and evicting Jake.

Although Savannah manages to prevent the sale from the property, Jake decides that being with Savannah is not for the best and he moves out of the property without saying goodbye. Belle then has a talk with the heartbroken Savannah in which she tells Belle that she really did love Jake.

In the final scene, as Savannah prepares to board a train to return to New York, Belle arrives in her car with Jake who runs and joins Savannah on the train. Belle had previously told Jake the truth about trying to keep them apart. Savannah returns to New York with Jake, who decides to give "big city" life a chance. Belle happily watches them leave town for good.

Cast
Melinda Clarke as Savannah Delongpre
John Clayton Schafer as Jake Gilbert
Louise Fletcher as Belle Delongpre
Wendy Davis as Roni
Yorgo Constantine as Robert Lee
Molly Shannon as Traci
Montrose Hagins as Ruth
Bill Hollis as Henry
Richard Keats as Burt
James T. Callahan as Mr. Bowman
David Dunard as the Two Moon Taxi Driver
Matt Frewer as transvestite fashion designer Cleo/Leo

References

External links
 
 

1995 films
1995 directorial debut films
1995 romantic drama films
1990s erotic drama films
American romantic drama films
American erotic drama films
American sequel films
Erotic romance films
Films directed by Farhad Mann
1990s English-language films
1990s American films